The King Mosque ( or Xhamia e Hynqarit) or Sultan Bayezid Mosque is a historical Ottoman-era mosque within the Ottoman Elbasan Castle in the town of Elbasan, Albania.

The mosque was built by Sultan Bayazid II around 1482–1485. This makes it one of the oldest active mosques in Albania besides the Fatih Mosque in Durrës. It became a Cultural Monument of Albania in 1948.

See also
 Islam in Albania

References

Cultural Monuments of Albania
Buildings and structures in Elbasan
Mosques in Albania
Tourist attractions in Elbasan County
Ottoman architecture in Albania